Tekniikan Maailma, abbreviation TM, is one of the leading automobile magazines in published in Helsinki, Finland, and the biggest all around technology magazine in Scandinavia.

History and profile
Tekniikan Maailma started in 1953. The magazine is based in Helsinki. It is owned by Otavamedia and is published monthly by Yhtyneet Kuvalehdet Oy.

Tekniikan Maailma covers all kinds of technology but around half of its content is related to automobiles.

Circulation
In 2002 Tekniikan Maailma had a circulation of 140,838 copies. The circulation of the magazine was 145,900 copies in 2006 and 150,800 copies in 2007.

In 2009 Tekniikan Maailma was 148,000 copies. In 2010 its circulation fell to 93,747 copies, but it grew to 102,947 copies in 2011. In 2012 the circulation of the magazine rose to 103,914 copies and to 109,490 copies in 2013.

References

External links

Tekniikan Maailma official site

1953 establishments in Finland
Automobile magazines published in Finland
Finnish-language magazines
Magazines established in 1953
Magazines published in Helsinki
Monthly magazines published in Finland
Science and technology magazines